Maurice L'Abbé (1920 – July 21, 2006) was a Canadian academic and mathematician.

Born in Ottawa, Ontario, L'Abbé  obtained his license in mathematics in 1945 from the Université de Montréal, and a doctorate in mathematics from the Princeton University in 1951. He joined the faculty of science in the Université de Montréal becoming an associate professor in 1950 and full professor in 1956. He was director of the Université de Montréal's Department of Mathematics from 1957 to 1968. He was dean of the Faculty of Science from 1964 to 1968 and Vice-Rector for Research from 1968 to 1978.

In 1968, he helped to establish the Centre de Recherches Mathématiques, the first mathematical research institute in Canada.

Honours
In 1993, he was made an Officer of the National Order of Quebec. In 1994, he was awarded the Prix Armand-Frappier.

References

1920 births
2006 deaths
Canadian mathematicians
Canadian university and college faculty deans
Officers of the National Order of Quebec
People from Ottawa
Princeton University alumni
Université de Montréal alumni
Academic staff of the Université de Montréal
Presidents of the Canadian Mathematical Society